Alachua County Today is a weekly newspaper in Alachua County, Florida.  The publication, which was established in November 2000, was originally known as Alachua Today and published its first edition on December 14, 2000. The paper is distributed every Thursday. 

The focus of the publication is the small towns around Gainesville, Fla. The main cities and towns covered by Alachua County Today are Alachua, High Springs, Newberry, Hawthorne, LaCrosse, Archer and Waldo. 

Alachua County Today charges $0.25 per issue.

Awards
In 2002 and 2003, Alachua County Today was named the best weekly newspaper in the state of Florida by the Florida Press Association.

References

External links
 Alachua County Today archives are openly available with zoomable page images and full searchable text in the University of Florida Digital Collections

Alachua County, Florida
Newspapers published in Florida
2000 establishments in Florida
Newspapers established in 2000